{{DISPLAYTITLE:Valine dehydrogenase (NADP+)}}

In enzymology, a valine dehydrogenase (NADP+) is an enzyme that catalyzes the chemical reaction

L-valine + H2O + NADP+  3-methyl-2-oxobutanoate + NH3 + NADPH + H+

The 3 substrates of this enzyme are L-valine, H2O, and NADP+, whereas its 4 products are 3-methyl-2-oxobutanoate, NH3, NADPH, and H+.

This enzyme belongs to the family of oxidoreductases, specifically those acting on the CH-NH2 group of donors with NAD+ or NADP+ as acceptor. The systematic name of this enzyme class is L-valine:NADP+ oxidoreductase (deaminating). Other names in common use include valine dehydrogenase (nicotinamide adenine dinucleotide phosphate), and valine dehydrogenase (NADP+).

References

 
 
 
 

EC 1.4.1
NADPH-dependent enzymes
Enzymes of unknown structure